Joan Winsor Blos (December 9, 1928 – October 12, 2017) was an American writer, teacher and advocate for children's literacy.

For her 1979 historical novel, A Gathering of Days, Blos won the U.S. National Book Award in category Children's Books
and the Newbery Medal for the year's most distinguished contribution to American children's literature.

She was born in New York City.
She lived in Ann Arbor, Michigan.

Works 
1971 Just Think (with Betty Miles)
1979 A Gathering of Days; A New England Girl's Journal, 1830–32
1984 Martin's Hats
1985 Brothers of the Heart: A Story of the Old Northwest, 1837–1838
1988 Old Henry
1989 The Grandpa Days
1989 Lottie's Circus
1991 The Heroine of the Titanic: A Tale Both True and Otherwise of the Life of  Molly Brown
1992 A Seed a Flower a Minute, an Hour
1994 Brooklyn Doesn't Rhyme
1995 The Hungry Little Boy
1996 Nellie Bly's Monkey: His Remarkable Story in His Own Words
1997 One Very Best Valentine's Day
1998 Bedtime!
1999 Hello, Shoes!
2007 Letters From the Corrugated Castle

Notes

References

External links

Joan Blos. Ann Arbor Book Festival website.  Retrieved July 2, 2006.
About Joan W. Blos – Biography. HarperCollins Publishers website.  Retrieved July 2, 2006.
Internet School Library Media Center bibliography

 

1928 births
2017 deaths
American children's writers
American historical novelists
Newbery Medal winners
National Book Award for Young People's Literature winners
Writers from Ann Arbor, Michigan
American women novelists
Women historical novelists
Writers from New York City
20th-century American novelists
20th-century American women writers
21st-century American novelists
21st-century American women writers
University of Michigan faculty
Novelists from New York (state)
Novelists from Michigan
American women academics